Hartsburg is a village in Logan County, Illinois, United States. The population was 314 at the 2010 census.

Geography

Demographics

Per the 2010 United States Census, Hartsburg had 314 people.  Among non-Hispanics this includes 300 White (95.5%) & 5 from two or more races.  The Hispanic or Latino population included 9 people (2.9%).

There were 128 households, out of which 28.1% had children under the age of 18 living with them, 50.8% were married couples living together, 8.6% had a female householder with children & no husband present, and 28.9% were non-families. 25.8% of all households were made up of individuals, and 28.9% had someone who was 65 years of age or older.

The population was spread out, with 77.4% over the age of 18 and 15.3% who were 65 years of age or older. The median age was 39.5 years. The gender ratio was 48.1% male & 51.9% female.  Among 128 occupied households, 82.8% were owner-occupied & 17.8% were renter-occupied.

As of the census of 2000, there were 358 people, 132 households, and 99 families residing in the village. The racial makeup of the village was 99.72% White and 0.28% Native American.

There were 132 households, out of which 37.1% had children under the age of 18 living with them, 59.8% were married couples living together, 9.8% had a female householder with no husband present, and 25.0% were non-families. 20.5% of all households were made up of individuals, and 11.4% had someone living alone who was 65 years of age or older. The average household size was 2.71 and the average family size was 3.08.

In the village, the population was spread out, with 27.7% under the age of 18, 10.9% from 18 to 24, 29.1% from 25 to 44, 16.8% from 45 to 64, and 15.6% who were 65 years of age or older. The median age was 35 years. For every 100 females, there were 98.9 males. For every 100 females age 18 and over, there were 97.7 males.

The median income for a household in the village was $39,000, and the median income for a family was $39,750. Males had a median income of $31,538 versus $19,125 for females. The per capita income for the village was $17,057. About 6.7% of families and 8.5% of the population were below the poverty line, including 15.0% of those under age 18 and 11.3% of those age 65 or over.

References

Villages in Logan County, Illinois
Villages in Illinois